Nayland is a suburb of Stoke, New Zealand. It lies to the north of Stoke, close to Nelson Airport, southwest of Nelson city centre.

Geography

Nayland covers an area of 0.84 km².

History

The estimated population of Nayland reached 1,600 in 1996.

It reached 1,630 in 2001, 1,632 in 2006, 1,725 in 2013, and 1,899 in 2018.

Demography

Nayland had a population of 1,899 at the 2018 New Zealand census, an increase of 174 people (10.1%) since the 2013 census, and an increase of 267 people (16.4%) since the 2006 census. There were 717 households. There were 903 males and 996 females, giving a sex ratio of 0.91 males per female. The median age was 38.5 years (compared with 37.4 years nationally), with 393 people (20.7%) aged under 15 years, 351 (18.5%) aged 15 to 29, 867 (45.7%) aged 30 to 64, and 291 (15.3%) aged 65 or older.

Ethnicities were 89.3% European/Pākehā, 12.5% Māori, 3.8% Pacific peoples, 4.4% Asian, and 2.1% other ethnicities (totals add to more than 100% since people could identify with multiple ethnicities).

The proportion of people born overseas was 14.1%, compared with 27.1% nationally.

Although some people objected to giving their religion, 55.9% had no religion, 32.1% were Christian, 0.6% were Hindu, 1.1% were Buddhist and 3.0% had other religions.

Of those at least 15 years old, 210 (13.9%) people had a bachelor or higher degree, and 339 (22.5%) people had no formal qualifications. The median income was $30,300, compared with $31,800 nationally. The employment status of those at least 15 was that 777 (51.6%) people were employed full-time, 276 (18.3%) were part-time, and 42 (2.8%) were unemployed.

Economy

In 2018, 12.9% worked in manufacturing, 9.7% worked in construction, 6.6% worked in hospitality, 6.6% worked in transport, 7.1% worked in education, and 11.4% worked in healthcare.

Transport

As of 2018, among those who commuted to work, 71.1% drove a car, 4.0% rode in a car, 6.6% use a bike, and 6.6% walk or run.

No one used public transport.

Education

References

Suburbs of Nelson, New Zealand
Populated places in the Nelson Region